Bjørn Hjalmar Sand (born 19 September 1928) is a Norwegian revue writer and actor. 

He was born in Oslo, and is half brother of Rolf Sand. He married Unni Bernhoft in 1955, is son-in-law of Bias Bernhoft and is the father of Jon Ola Sand. He is particularly known for his character "Stutum" on Norwegian radio, a role which earned him the award  Spellemannprisen 1973. He was awarded the Leonard Statuette in 1994.

References

1928 births
Living people
Male actors from Oslo
Norwegian writers
Norwegian male stage actors
Leonard Statuette winners
Spellemannprisen winners
Norwegian male radio actors